Fidan Doğan (17 January 1982 – 9 January 2013) was a Kurdish activist and member of the Kurdistan Workers' Party, who worked at the Kurdish information centre in Paris and also represented the Brussels-based Kurdistan National Congress in France.

Born in Elbistan in southern Turkey, Doğan moved to France when she was young. She grew up in Strasbourg, where she completed her university education. She was engaged in the Kurdistan National Congress and was a women's rights activist.

Death

She was assassinated in Paris on 9 January 2013, along with Sakine Cansız and Leyla Şöylemez. On 17 January in Diyarbakir tens of thousands of Kurds remembered the three women in a ceremony. 

Fidan Doğan was buried in her family's village in the Elbistan district of Kahramanmaraş province, Turkey. The funeral, conducted by an Alevi dede, was attended by around 5,000 people, the coffin was wrapped in the flag of the PKK whilst mourners wore white scarves to symbolise peace. The mourners included Peace and Democracy Party co-chair Gülten Kışanak, and deputies Nursel Aydoğan, Ayla Akat Ata, Hasip Kaplan as well as the mayor of Diyarbakır Osman Baydemir. Speaking at the Funeral Kışanak is quoted as saying; "We promise to all Kurdish women and these three women: We will bring peace and freedom to this land,”.

Aftermath
Tributes after her death revealed that she was well known in political circles, as well as being close to Abdullah Öcalan, one of the founders of the PKK. The President of the European Parliament, Martin Schulz, made a point of receiving her family to pay his condolences in person. The rapporteur for Turkey of the Council of Europe's Parliamentary Assembly, Josette Durrieu, also paid tribute in glowing terms.

François Hollande's statement that he knew one of the three women assassinated in Paris (which provoked a strong reaction from Turkish Prime Minister Recep Tayyip Erdoğan), raised speculation that Doğan was also in regular contact with the French president.

After her death, there was considerable speculation that the killing of the three women was an attempt to derail the fledgling peace process that had recently begun between the Turkish authorities and Öcalan.

References

1982 births
2013 deaths
Assassinated activists
Assassinated Kurdish people
Deaths by firearm in France
Female murder victims
Kurdish activists
Kurdish Alevis
People from Elbistan
People murdered in Paris
Kurdish human rights activists
Kurdish women's rights activists
Members of the Kurdistan Workers' Party
Turkish people murdered abroad
Unsolved murders in France
2013 murders in France
2010s murders in Paris